Bruce Strauss (born February 6, 1952, in Omaha, Nebraska) is an American retired boxer who is more known for his losses than for his wins. His nickname is The Mouse or simply Mouse. He achieved notoriety in the 1970s and 1980s after fighting, and generally losing, to a wide variety of opponents, with him also being known for his cheery, easy-going personality. His life was made into the well-received 1997 comedy-drama film The Mouse, in which he was portrayed by actor John Savage.

Generally a middleweight using a "colorful" fighting style, Strauss opened his career on June 1, 1976, with a four-round decision win over Gary Maize (also listed as "Gary Maiza") in Oklahoma City, Oklahoma. He has estimated that he has fought over 300 times over the years, with most matches taking place through using aliases and other forms of subterfuge to get around rules. His long career took him to multiple continents and saw him facing a large group of opponents.

Career and personal life
First dubbed "Mousie" during his school years in New Milford, New Jersey, Strauss began intensive bodybuilding while in high school. From his early boxing days, he was often described as a "journeyman", a title given to fighters who typically fight anyone and anywhere, often on short notice. Nevertheless, he became famous around boxing circles because of the number of fights he lost by knockout. Officially, he lost 28 fights by knockout out of a total of 53 losses, but it has been estimated that, combined with his fights using the Ruben Bardot alias, he might have actually lost more than 150 fights by knockout. He himself has made mockery of his knockout loss number, stating that he is "probably the only boxer in history that has lost by knockout on every continent."

He once joked that the only reason that he hadn't fought and lost in Antarctica was that he hated being cold. In a 1990 Kayo boxing cards set, he posed while sitting on the canvas, with black make-up covering his eye, as he held on to a ring rope. As stated before, he would sometimes use the alias of "Ruben Bardot" to obtain fights.

Strauss has revealed that he got around rules forcing boxers to wait a certain amount of time, over a month, before fighting again by measures such as donning disguises and filling his pockets with lead to change his weight class. The book Boxing in America: An Autopsy labeled him a "colorful" fighter that became "something of a legend". It remarked as well that he "made a habit of doing whatever it took to survive at times", noting how Strauss once quipped to a referee upset with Strauss' unfair low blows that "Well, it ain't fair that he's better than me, neither."

A 1997 article in The New York Times described Strauss as a "tireless but inept 'professional opponent'", while also comparing him to "the stock caricature of the cuddly loudmouthed palooka." The newspaper also stated, "For Bruce, losing isn't just a reliable way of make a living, it's his personal philosophy." Strauss has declared that most of his matches weren't done in his own name, having fought (and mostly lost) more than three hundred times in his long career in his estimation.

His career began on June 1, 1976, in Oklahoma City, Oklahoma, when Strauss debuted as a professional boxer. Outpointing Gary Maize (also listed as 'Gary Maiza') after four rounds, he soon set off on the road. His first official knockout defeat came at the hands of Mauricio Aldana on January 10, 1979, fighting in Las Vegas. Strauss also lost fights by knockout in Africa (Cameroon, South Africa), Europe (France, Germany, and Italy), South America (Peru), and Oceania (Fiji). It is unclear whether he actually lost a fight by knockout in Australia or Asia under the "Ruben Bardot" alias.

Strauss fought a number of top challengers and world champions in the middleweight division, including Charlie Weir, Bobby Czyz, Eckhard Dagge, Al Ford, Billy Collins, Mike McCallum, Marlon Starling, David Braxton, and Davey Hilton, among others. He also fought former World Lightweight Champion Harry Arroyo.

His last official fight was a six-round decision win over Terry Jesmer on November 24, 1989. The match took place in Bismarck, North Dakota inside the city's Civic Center.

Strauss officially has a record of 78 wins, 53 losses, and 6 draws (ties), although it has also been reported as 77 wins compared to 53 losses and 6 ties. He is additionally reported to have, officially, 55 knockout wins and 28 knockout losses. As remarked before, he typically fought as a middleweight and used an orthodox stance.

In 1997, a movie was released based on his career entitled The Mouse, in which actor John Savage portrayed him. Written and directed by Dan Adams, the comedy-drama film also starred actress Angelica Torn as Mary Lou Strauss, the Mouse's wife. The movie received praise from publications such as The New York Times. Also featuring comedian Rip Torn, the film featured a number of cameo appearances from well-known boxers such as Randall "Tex" Cobb, Ray Mancini, Vito Antuofermo, and Sean O'Grady.

Professional boxing record

|-
|align="center" colspan=8|77 wins (55 knockouts, 22 decisions), 53 losses (28 knockouts, 25 decisions), 6 draws
|-
| align="center" style="border-style: none none solid solid; background: #e3e3e3"|Result
| align="center" style="border-style: none none solid solid; background: #e3e3e3"|Record
| align="center" style="border-style: none none solid solid; background: #e3e3e3"|Opponent
| align="center" style="border-style: none none solid solid; background: #e3e3e3"|Type
| align="center" style="border-style: none none solid solid; background: #e3e3e3"|Round
| align="center" style="border-style: none none solid solid; background: #e3e3e3"|Date
| align="center" style="border-style: none none solid solid; background: #e3e3e3"|Location
| align="center" style="border-style: none none solid solid; background: #e3e3e3"|Notes
|-
|Win
|
|align=left| Terry Jesmer
|UD
|6
|24/10/1989
|align=left| Bismarck, North Dakota, United States
|align=left|
|-
|Win
|
|align=left| Dave Reynolds
|KO
|3
|27/05/1989
|align=left| Bismarck, North Dakota, United States
|align=left|
|-
|Win
|
|align=left| Howard Stern
|KO
|6
|04/03/1989
|align=left| Bismarck, North Dakota, United States
|align=left|
|-
|Loss
|
|align=left| Harry Arroyo
|TKO
|2
|26/01/1989
|align=left| Rochester, New York, United States
|align=left|
|-
|Loss
|
|align=left| Wayne Grant
|SD
|6
|13/08/1988
|align=left| Saint Joseph, Missouri, United States
|align=left|
|-
|Win
|
|align=left| Wayne Grant
|UD
|6
|09/04/1988
|align=left| Joplin, Missouri, United States
|align=left|
|-
|Win
|
|align=left| Dave Reynolds
|TKO
|6
|03/04/1988
|align=left| Bismarck, North Dakota, United States
|align=left|
|-
|Win
|
|align=left|Ron Falk
|KO
|6
|02/11/1986
|align=left| Macy, Nebraska, United States
|align=left|
|-
|Win
|
|align=left| Wayne Grant
|KO
|8
|01/11/1985
|align=left| Louisville, Kentucky, United States
|align=left|
|-
|Win
|
|align=left| Wayne Grant
|UD
|8
|01/10/1985
|align=left| Lebanon Junction, Kentucky, United States
|align=left|
|-
|Win
|
|align=left| Al Bell
|KO
|4
|14/06/1985
|align=left| Louisville, Kentucky, United States
|align=left|
|-
|Loss
|
|align=left| Danny Ferris
|UD
|8
|16/03/1985
|align=left| Troy, New York, United States
|align=left|
|-
|Win
|
|align=left|"Diamond" Jim McLean
|PTS
|4
|22/02/1985
|align=left| Hammond, Indiana, United States
|align=left|
|-
|Win
|
|align=left| Clyde Beattie
|UD
|8
|01/02/1985
|align=left| Troy, New York, United States
|align=left|
|-
|Loss
|
|align=left| Ken Snider
|UD
|8
|23/01/1985
|align=left| Indianapolis, Indiana, United States
|align=left|
|-
|Loss
|
|align=left| Jeff Silva
|UD
|6
|09/11/1984
|align=left| Peoria, Illinois, United States
|align=left|
|-
|Loss
|
|align=left| Ken Snider
|PTS
|6
|30/10/1984
|align=left| Evansville, Indiana, United States
|align=left|
|-
|Loss
|
|align=left| Mike Hutchinson
|KO
|3
|27/10/1984
|align=left| Tuscaloosa, Alabama, United States
|align=left|
|-
|Loss
|
|align=left| Jack Callahan
|UD
|6
|23/10/1984
|align=left| Highland, Lake County, Indiana, United States
|align=left|
|-
|Win
|
|align=left| Pete "Polish Hammer" Podgorski
|SD
|8
|10/07/1984
|align=left| Highland, Lake County, Indiana, United States
|align=left|
|-
|Draw
|
|align=left| Danny Ferris
|PTS
|8
|06/06/1984
|align=left| Atlantic City, New Jersey, United States
|align=left|
|-
|Win
|
|align=left| Billy Doyle
|KO
|6
|16/05/1984
|align=left| Fort Wayne, Indiana, United States
|align=left|
|-
|Win
|
|align=left| Billy Turner
|KO
|3
|23/03/1984
|align=left| Rapid City, South Dakota, United States
|align=left|
|-
|Draw
|
|align=left| Mike Pollitt
|PTS
|6
|13/03/1984
|align=left| Highland, Lake County, Indiana, United States
|align=left|
|-
|Loss
|
|align=left| Mike Pollitt
|PTS
|5
|07/02/1984
|align=left| Highland, Lake County, Indiana, United States
|align=left|
|-
|Loss
|
|align=left| Brian Brunette
|TKO
|6
|08/12/1983
|align=left| Saint Paul, Minnesota, United States
|align=left|
|-
|Loss
|
|align=left| Dave Hilton, Jr.
|KO
|3
|29/07/1983
|align=left| Cornwall, Ontario, Canada
|align=left|
|-
|Loss
|
|align=left| Fernando Rocco Castro
|KO
|4
|30/04/1983
|align=left| Lima, Peru
|align=left|
|-
|Draw
|
|align=left| Mike Pollitt
|PTS
|6
|12/04/1983
|align=left| Indianapolis, Indiana, United States
|align=left|
|-
|Loss
|
|align=left| Monte Oswald
|KO
|3
|05/03/1983
|align=left| Bay City, Michigan, United States
|align=left|
|-
|Loss
|
|align=left| Helier Custos
|KO
|2
|24/02/1983
|align=left| Paris, France
|align=left|
|-
|Loss
|
|align=left| Wilbert Johnson
|KO
|2
|25/01/1983
|align=left| Indianapolis, Indiana, United States
|align=left|
|-
|Win
|
|align=left|Richard Thomas
|KO
|6
|08/01/1983
|align=left| Davenport, Iowa, United States
|align=left|
|-
|Win
|
|align=left| Mike Pollitt
|TKO
|5
|08/12/1982
|align=left| Omaha, Nebraska, United States
|align=left|
|-
|Loss
|
|align=left| Mike Pollitt
|PTS
|5
|03/11/1982
|align=left| Indianapolis, Indiana, United States
|align=left|
|-
|Win
|
|align=left|Fred Morris
|KO
|4
|27/10/1982
|align=left| West Fargo, North Dakota, United States
|align=left|
|-
|Loss
|
|align=left| Harlen Holden
|TKO
|7
|13/10/1982
|align=left| Chicago, Illinois, United States
|align=left|
|-
|Loss
|
|align=left| Lester Groves
|SD
|8
|07/10/1982
|align=left| Winnipeg, Manitoba, Canada
|align=left|
|-
|Loss
|
|align=left| Maurice Watkins
|KO
|3
|17/08/1982
|align=left| Lafayette, Louisiana, United States
|align=left|
|-
|Loss
|
|align=left| Sakaraia Ve
|KO
|3
|03/07/1982
|align=left| Suva, Fiji
|align=left|
|-
|Win
|
|align=left| Billy Turner
|KO
|7
|24/05/1982
|align=left| Deadwood, South Dakota, United States
|align=left|
|-
|Loss
|
|align=left| "Irish" Billy Collins, Jr.
|KO
|3
|20/05/1982
|align=left| Atlantic City, New Jersey, United States
|align=left|
|-
|Win
|
|align=left| Nick Wills
|KO
|6
|20/04/1982
|align=left| Fargo, North Dakota, United States
|align=left|
|-
|Loss
|
|align=left| Dale Hernandez
|PTS
|10
|06/04/1982
|align=left| Omaha, Nebraska, United States
|align=left|
|-
|Loss
|
|align=left| Jean-Andre Emmerich
|PTS
|8
|26/03/1982
|align=left| Kiel, Schleswig-Holstein, Germany
|align=left|
|-
|Win
|
|align=left| Pete Susens
|UD
|6
|18/03/1982
|align=left| Dodge City, Kansas, United States
|align=left|
|-
|Win
|
|align=left| Larry Puchta
|PTS
|10
|17/03/1982
|align=left| Sioux Falls, South Dakota, United States
|align=left|
|-
|Win
|
|align=left| Charlie Keller
|KO
|7
|25/02/1982
|align=left| Sioux Falls, South Dakota, United States
|align=left|
|-
|Loss
|
|align=left| Al Ford
|UD
|10
|12/02/1982
|align=left| Winnipeg, Manitoba, Canada
|align=left|
|-
|Loss
|
|align=left| Jean-Marie Emebe
|KO
|3
|30/01/1982
|align=left| Yaounde, Cameroon
|align=left|
|-
|Win
|
|align=left| Willie Dean
|KO
|5
|31/12/1981
|align=left| Indianapolis, Indiana, United States
|align=left|
|-
|Draw
|
|align=left| Ghyslain Deroy
|PTS
|10
|10/12/1981
|align=left| Winnipeg, Manitoba, Canada
|align=left|
|-
|Loss
|
|align=left| Larry Stanton
|KO
|3
|30/11/1981
|align=left| Richmond Hill, New York, United States
|align=left|
|-
|Loss
|
|align=left| Danny Long
|PTS
|8
|25/11/1981
|align=left| Boston, Massachusetts, United States
|align=left|
|-
|Win
|
|align=left| Charlie Peterson
|TKO
|4
|05/11/1981
|align=left| Merrillville, Indiana, United States
|align=left|
|-
|Win
|
|align=left| Pete Susens
|TKO
|6
|24/10/1981
|align=left| Dodge City, Kansas, United States
|align=left|
|-
|Win
|
|align=left| Darrell Miller
|KO
|4
|10/10/1981
|align=left| Kansas City, Missouri, United States
|align=left|
|-
|Loss
|
|align=left| Gary "Hammer" Holmgren
|PTS
|10
|07/10/1981
|align=left| Saint Paul, Minnesota, United States
|align=left|
|-
|Loss
|
|align=left| Eckhard Dagge
|PTS
|8
|25/09/1981
|align=left| Cologne, Nordrhein-Westfalen, Germany
|align=left|
|-
|Win
|
|align=left| Tommy Degen
|PTS
|8
|20/09/1981
|align=left| Grand Island, Nebraska, United States
|align=left|
|-
|Loss
|
|align=left| Gordie Lawson
|KO
|5
|04/09/1981
|align=left| Vancouver, British Columbia, Canada
|align=left|
|-
|Win
|
|align=left| Nicky Jefferson
|KO
|4
|28/08/1981
|align=left| Omaha, Nebraska, United States
|align=left|
|-
|Win
|
|align=left| Ken Reed
|KO
|5
|23/08/1981
|align=left| Grand Island, Nebraska, United States
|align=left|
|-
|Loss
|
|align=left| Gordie Lawson
|PTS
|8
|07/08/1981
|align=left| Port Alberni, British Columbia, Canada
|align=left|
|-
|Win
|
|align=left| Charlie Powell
|TKO
|4
|23/07/1981
|align=left| Winnipeg, Manitoba, Canada
|align=left|
|-
|Loss
|
|align=left| Mike "Bodysnatcher" McCallum
|TKO
|3
|19/07/1981
|align=left| Warren, Ohio, United States
|align=left|
|-
|Win
|
|align=left| Nick Miller
|KO
|4
|13/06/1981
|align=left| Gary, Indiana, United States
|align=left|
|-
|Win
|
|align=left| Billy Goodwin
|SD
|10
|06/06/1981
|align=left| Amery, Wisconsin, United States
|align=left|
|-
|Win
|
|align=left| Jo Jo Jackson
|SD
|6
|08/05/1981
|align=left| Winnipeg, Manitoba, Canada
|align=left|
|-
|Loss
|
|align=left| Bobby Plegge
|PTS
|8
|26/04/1981
|align=left| Canton, Ohio, United States
|align=left|
|-
|Loss
|
|align=left| David Braxton
|TKO
|4
|23/04/1981
|align=left| Detroit, Michigan, United States
|align=left|
|-
|Win
|
|align=left| Mark Hughes
|KO
|8
|06/04/1981
|align=left| Bloomington, Minnesota, United States
|align=left|
|-
|Win
|
|align=left| Jimmy Baker
|PTS
|6
|28/03/1981
|align=left| Chicago, Illinois, United States
|align=left|
|-
|Loss
|
|align=left| Mark Hughes
|SD
|6
|19/03/1981
|align=left| Saint Joseph, Missouri, United States
|align=left|
|-
|Loss
|
|align=left| Marlon "Magic Man" Starling
|KO
|2
|09/02/1981
|align=left| Hartford, Connecticut, United States
|align=left|
|-
|Loss
|
|align=left| Tony McMinn
|KO
|5
|31/01/1981
|align=left| Miami, Oklahoma, United States
|align=left|
|-
|Win
|
|align=left| Rowan Johnson
|KO
|5
|11/01/1981
|align=left| Saint Louis, Missouri, United States
|align=left|
|-
|Win
|
|align=left| Ernie Davis
|PTS
|8
|11/12/1980
|align=left| Kansas City, Missouri, United States
|align=left|
|-
|Win
|
|align=left| Pete Susens
|KO
|6
|01/11/1980
|align=left| Wichita, Kansas, United States
|align=left|
|-
|Win
|
|align=left| Darrell Ned Miller
|KO
|5
|30/10/1980
|align=left| Louisville, Kentucky, United States
|align=left|
|-
|Win
|
|align=left|Malcolm "X" Gordon
|TKO
|2
|28/10/1980
|align=left| Indianapolis, Indiana, United States
|align=left|
|-
|Loss
|
|align=left| Danny Paul
|TKO
|4
|30/09/1980
|align=left| Niles, Illinois, United States
|align=left|
|-
|Loss
|
|align=left| Johnny Compo
|UD
|8
|23/09/1980
|align=left| Edmonton, Alberta, Canada
|align=left|
|-
|Win
|
|align=left| Charlie Keller
|KO
|10
|06/09/1980
|align=left| Sioux Falls, South Dakota, United States
|align=left|
|-
|Win
|
|align=left|Dave Holmgren
|KO
|6
|30/08/1980
|align=left| North Platte, Nebraska, United States
|align=left|
|-
|Win
|
|align=left| Dave Gordon
|KO
|5
|29/08/1980
|align=left| Grand Island, Nebraska, United States
|align=left|
|-
|Win
|
|align=left| Dave Grant
|KO
|5
|24/07/1980
|align=left| Winnipeg, Manitoba, Canada
|align=left|
|-
|Win
|
|align=left| Nick Miller
|KO
|4
|18/07/1980
|align=left| Grand Island, Nebraska, United States
|align=left|
|-
|Loss
|
|align=left| Bobby Czyz
|KO
|4
|17/07/1980
|align=left| Totowa, New Jersey, United States
|align=left|
|-
|Win
|
|align=left| Billy Turner
|KO
|5
|28/06/1980
|align=left| Rapid City, South Dakota, United States
|align=left|
|-
|Win
|
|align=left| Billy "The Kid Evans
|KO
|3
|20/06/1980
|align=left| Fort Wayne, Indiana, United States
|align=left|
|-
|Win
|
|align=left| Nick Wills
|KO
|3
|18/06/1980
|align=left| Struthers, Ohio, United States
|align=left|
|-
|Loss
|
|align=left| Charles LaCour
|SD
|8
|13/06/1980
|align=left| Nanaimo, British Columbia, Canada
|align=left|
|-
|Win
|
|align=left| Dave Bolden
|PTS
|8
|06/06/1980
|align=left| Kansas City, Missouri, United States
|align=left|
|-
|Win
|
|align=left| Rodney Foster
|KO
|3
|13/05/1980
|align=left| Indianapolis, Indiana, United States
|align=left|
|-
|Win
|
|align=left|Ron Madsap
|KO
|3
|26/04/1980
|align=left| Hastings, Iowa, United States
|align=left|
|-
|Loss
|
|align=left| Ralph Racine
|KO
|5
|24/04/1980
|align=left| Winnipeg, Manitoba, Canada
|align=left|
|-
|Win
|
|align=left|Darryl Springer
|KO
|4
|19/04/1980
|align=left| Council Bluffs, Iowa, United States
|align=left|
|-
|Loss
|
|align=left| Nino Gonzalez
|TKO
|8
|01/04/1980
|align=left| Totowa, New Jersey, United States
|align=left|
|-
|Loss
|
|align=left| Juan Jose Gimenez
|KO
|5
|29/03/1980
|align=left| Rome, Lazio, Italy
|align=left|
|-
|Win
|
|align=left| Ralph Jackson
|TKO
|2
|16/03/1980
|align=left| Omaha, Nebraska, United States
|align=left|
|-
|Win
|
|align=left| O'Dell Willis
|PTS
|6
|07/03/1980
|align=left| Kansas City, Missouri, United States
|align=left|
|-
|Loss
|
|align=left| Dave Simmonds
|PTS
|10
|29/02/1980
|align=left| Nanaimo, British Columbia, Canada
|align=left|
|-
|Loss
|
|align=left| Charlie Weir
|TKO
|1
|09/02/1980
|align=left| Johannesburg, South Africa
|align=left|
|-
|Win
|
|align=left| Frank Patterson
|TKO
|4
|20/12/1979
|align=left| Wichita, Kansas, United States
|align=left|
|-
|Win
|
|align=left|"Tiny" Tim Ellis
|KO
|2
|14/12/1979
|align=left| Evansville, Indiana, United States
|align=left|
|-
|Win
|
|align=left| Dave Reynolds
|TKO
|3
|08/12/1979
|align=left| Winnipeg, Manitoba, Canada
|align=left|
|-
|Win
|
|align=left| Billy Evans
|TKO
|3
|02/12/1979
|align=left| Muncie, Indiana, United States
|align=left|
|-
|Draw
|
|align=left| Macon Davis
|PTS
|4
|27/11/1979
|align=left| Miami Beach, Florida, United States
|align=left|
|-
|Loss
|
|align=left| Eddie Marcelle
|TKO
|7
|16/11/1979
|align=left| Mucurapo, Trinidad and Tobago
|align=left|
|-
|Win
|
|align=left|Tim Mullens
|TKO
|4
|01/11/1979
|align=left| Wichita, Kansas, United States
|align=left|
|-
|Win
|
|align=left|Tim Mullens
|TKO
|5
|27/10/1979
|align=left| Regina, Saskatchewan, Canada
|align=left|
|-
|Win
|
|align=left| Bryan Thompson
|TKO
|3
|09/10/1979
|align=left| Winnipeg, Manitoba, Canada
|align=left|
|-
|Loss
|
|align=left| Pat Hallacy
|UD
|10
|18/09/1979
|align=left| Wichita, Kansas, United States
|align=left|
|-
|Loss
|
|align=left| Charlie Peterson
|PTS
|8
|18/07/1979
|align=left| Indianapolis, Indiana, United States
|align=left|
|-
|Win
|
|align=left| Cicero Blake
|TKO
|6
|25/06/1979
|align=left| Omaha, Nebraska, United States
|align=left|
|-
|Draw
|
|align=left| Terry Jesmer
|PTS
|6
|14/06/1979
|align=left| Winnipeg, Manitoba, Canada
|align=left|
|-
|Win
|
|align=left| Floyd Pearson
|UD
|6
|11/06/1979
|align=left| Chicago, Illinois, United States
|align=left|
|-
|Win
|
|align=left| Ali Ayub
|TKO
|8
|31/05/1979
|align=left| Brandon, Manitoba, Canada
|align=left|
|-
|Win
|
|align=left| Larry Mayes
|TKO
|6
|12/05/1979
|align=left| Wichita, Kansas, United States
|align=left|
|-
|Win
|
|align=left| Larry Puchta
|PTS
|5
|04/05/1979
|align=left| Saint Paul, Minnesota, United States
|align=left|
|-
|Win
|
|align=left| Clyde Spencer
|TKO
|5
|28/04/1979
|align=left| Omaha, Nebraska, United States
|align=left|
|-
|Win
|
|align=left| Ossie Quast
|UD
|6
|20/04/1979
|align=left| Winnipeg, Manitoba, Canada
|align=left|
|-
|Loss
|
|align=left| Steve Kruger
|PTS
|5
|16/03/1979
|align=left| Saint Paul, Minnesota, United States
|align=left|
|-
|Win
|
|align=left| Nick Miller
|TKO
|4
|14/03/1979
|align=left| Marshalltown, Iowa, United States
|align=left|
|-
|Win
|
|align=left| Roy Taylor
|PTS
|4
|08/03/1979
|align=left| Wichita, Kansas, United States
|align=left|
|-
|Win
|
|align=left| Dave Grant
|KO
|5
|28/02/1979
|align=left| Saint Paul, Minnesota, United States
|align=left|
|-
|Win
|
|align=left| Ossie Quast
|PTS
|6
|14/02/1979
|align=left| Saint Paul, Minnesota, United States
|align=left|
|-
|Loss
|
|align=left| Ivy Brown
|KO
|1
|19/01/1979
|align=left| Overland Park, Kansas, United States
|align=left|
|-
|Loss
|
|align=left| Mauricio Aldana
|TKO
|1
|10/01/1979
|align=left| Las Vegas, Nevada, United States
|align=left|
|-
|Win
|
|align=left| Bill Thompson
|TKO
|3
|29/11/1978
|align=left| Council Bluffs, Iowa, United States
|align=left|
|-
|Win
|
|align=left| Nino Cosmo
|PTS
|6
|21/09/1978
|align=left| Jersey City, New Jersey, United States
|align=left|
|-
|Win
|
|align=left| Clyde Spencer
|KO
|3
|15/11/1977
|align=left| Oklahoma City, United States
|align=left|
|-
|Loss
|
|align=left| Hank Gregory
|PTS
|6
|26/08/1976
|align=left| Kansas City, Missouri, United States
|align=left|
|-
|Win
|
|align=left| Tony McMinn
|KO
|3
|02/06/1976
|align=left| Topeka, Kansas, United States
|align=left|
|-
|Win
|
|align=left|Gary Maiza ('Gary Maize')
|PTS
|4
|01/06/1976
|align=left| Oklahoma City, United States
|align=left|
|}

See also
Journeyman (boxing)

References

External links

1952 births
Boxers from New York (state)
Living people
Middleweight boxers
People from Yonkers, New York
American male boxers